This is a list of visual kei musical groups. This list does not include individual solo musicians.

!-9
 12012
 9Goats Black Out

A
 Acid Black Cherry
 
 Aikaryu
 Aion
 Alice Nine
 Aliene Ma'riage
 An Cafe
 Angelo
 Anti Feminism
 Arlequin
 Ayabie

B
 Baiser
 Baroque
 BIS
 Blam Honey
 Blood
 Buck-Tick
 By-Sexual
 Breakerz

C
 Cali Gari
 The Candy Spooky Theater
 Cascade
 Charlotte
 Codomo Dragon
 Color
 Core the Child

D
 D
 D'erlanger
 D'espairsRay
 D=Out
 Dacco
 DaizyStripper
 Dead End
 The Dead Pop Stars
 Deadman
 Deathgaze
 Defspiral
 Deluhi
 Der Zibet
 Devil Kitty
 Dezert
 Diaura
 Dimlim
 Disacode
 Die in Cries
 Dio – Distraught Overlord
 Dir en grey
 Dolly
 Doremidan
 Dué le Quartz
 DuelJewel

E
 Eight
 El Dorado
 Exist Trace

F
 Fanatic Crisis

G
 The Gazette
 Genkaku Allergy
 Ghost
 Girugamesh
 Glacier
 Glay
 Golden Bomber
 Guniw Tools
 Guruguru Eigakan

H
 Heidi.
 hide with Spread Beaver
 Himitsu Kessha Kodomo A
 Hizaki Grace Project
 Hybrid-Zombiez

I
 Inugami Circus-dan
 Izabel Varosa

J
 Janne Da Arc
 Jealkb
 Jiluka
 Jupiter

K
 Kagerou
 Kagrra,
 Kamaitachi
 Kannivalism
 Karma Shenjing
 The Kiddie
 Kiryū
 Kizu
 Kra
 Kuroyume

L
 L'Arc~En~Ciel
 La'cryma Christi
 La'Mule
 Laputa
 Lareine
 LM.C
 Luis-Mary
 Luna Sea
 Lycaon
 Lynch.

M
 Malice Mizer
 Maschera
 Matenrou Opera
 Megamasso
 Mejibray
 Merry
 Mix Speaker's,Inc.
 Moi dix Mois
 Mucc

N
 Nightmare
 Nocturnal Bloodlust
 Nogod

P
 Panic Channel
 Penicillin
 Pentagon
 Phantasmagoria
 The Piass
 Pierrot
 Plastic Tree
 Psycho le Cému

R
 Raphael
 Rentrer en Soi
 Rice
 The Riotts.
 Roselia
 Rouage
 Royz

S
 S.K.I.N.
 Sadie
 Sads
 Schaft
 Schwarz Stein
 Screw
 Shazna
 Siam Shade
 Sid
 Sophia
 Spiv States
 Strawberry Song Orchestra
 Sug
 Sukekiyo

T
 Tinc

U
 Uchuu Sentai Noiz
 The Underneath
 Unsraw

V
 Versailles
 Vidoll
 Vistlip
 Vivid

W
 Wyse

X
 X Japan
 XTripx

Z
 Zi:Kill
 Zoro

Citations

References
 
 
 

 
Lists of bands
Visual kei musical groups